Mar (from  , written with a silent final yodh), also Mor in Western Syriac has the literal meaning "milord", it is a title of reverence in Syriac Christianity. The corresponding feminine forms are Morth and Marth for "milady". The title is placed before the Christian name, as in Mar Aprem/ Mor Afrem (Ephrem the Syrian) and Marth/ Morth Maryam for St Mary. It is given to all saints in Eastern Christianity and is also used in instead of "Most Reverend", just before the name in religion taken by bishops. The title of Moran Mor/ Maran Mar is given to the Catholicoi and other primates; and the title Mar/ Mor is given to prelates such as metropolitan bishops or archbishops.

In Christianity
The variant Moran or Maran, meaning "Our Lord", is a particular title given to Jesus, either alone or in combination with other names and titles. Likewise, Marth or Morth  ("Our Lady") is a title of Mary, mother of Jesus.

Occasionally, the term Maran or Moran has been used by various Eastern Christian patriarchs and catholicoi, who started using it in the recent centuries. The Syriac Orthodox Patriarch of Antioch, the Jacobite Syrian Catholicos titles are called Aboon Mor, while the Malankara Orthodox Catholicos use the title Moran Mor. Sometimes the Indian bearers of this title are called Moran Mar, using a hybrid style from both Syriac dialects that reflects somewhat the history of Syro-Malabar Christians. The Pope is referred to as Marpāpa (Holy Father) by the St Thomas Christians of India.

The variant Marya or Moryo is the original form of Mara/Moro, but only used in reference to God in the circle of Syriac Christianity. This word is used in the Peshitta Old Testament to render the Tetragrammaton. Although Mara/Moro is clearly a derived form of the above Marya/Moryo, and ultimately has roots in common Semitic, there is a fanciful derivation found in early Syriac lexica, that the word is an initialism as follows:

In Judaism
In Mishnaic Hebrew through to date, this Aramaic word is pronounced [mar], and it is used as a formal way of addressing or referring to a male person. In the Gemara, Tabyomi is sometimes referred to as Mar. "Mar" was also the title of the Exilarch (leader of the Jewish diaspora community in Babylon), with the Aramaic-speaking Jews sharing many cultural attributes with the Syriac Christians. In the Modern Hebrew of contemporary Israel, "Mar" is used without distinction for any male person, like "Mr." in English. However, in Rabbanical circles of Jews from the Middle East, the Aramaic variant form מָרָן (Maran, Aramaic: our lord) is still a title used for highly appreciated Rabbis, such as Ovadia Yosef, the spiritual leader of the Shas party.

In Mandaeism

See also
Syriac Christianity
Syriac language
Ancient Christianity in the Indian subcontinent

References

 

Aramaic words and phrases
Mandaic words and phrases
Syriac language
Syriac Christianity
Ecclesiastical styles
Men's social titles
Lords